William Donaldson House is a historic home located at Harrisburg, Dauphin County, Pennsylvania. It was designed by Smith & Warner and built in 1887, and is a -story Queen Anne style dwelling funded by William Mayne Donaldson, president of the Donaldson Paper Company. A rear addition was constructed about 1910. It has a stone foundation, brick first story, and wood shingle second and third stories. It features irregular massing, a variety of surface textures, multiple intersecting roofs, bay windows, porch and balconies, and a turret with spindle. The house was converted to apartments in 1925.

It was added to the National Register of Historic Places in 1990.

References

Buildings and structures in Harrisburg, Pennsylvania
Houses on the National Register of Historic Places in Pennsylvania
Queen Anne architecture in Pennsylvania
Houses completed in 1888
Houses in Dauphin County, Pennsylvania
National Register of Historic Places in Harrisburg, Pennsylvania